In art and art criticism, form and content are considered distinct aspects of a work of art. The term form refers to the work's composition, techniques and media used, and how the elements of design are implemented. It mainly focuses on the physical aspects of the artwork, such as medium, color, value, space, etc., rather than on what it communicates. Content, on the other hand, refers to a work's subject matter, i.e., its meaning. But the terms form and content can be applied not only to art: every meaningful text has its inherent form, hence form and content appear in very diverse applications of human thought: from fine arts to even mathematics and natural sciences. Even more, the distinction between these terms' meanings in different domains of application seems rather unnatural, since the idea behind "form and content in art" and "form and content in science" is pretty much the same.

Usage in art 

Form is one of the most frequent terms in literary criticism. It is often used merely to designate a genre or for patterns of meter lines and rhymes. For example, the subject of these two artworks is a bird, though both artworks are created in different styles. One is a two-dimensional artwork of two birds resting on a tree branch, created in a natural style, with realistic proportions. On the other hand, the jade bird carving, created with exaggerated proportions and a stylized expression, creates a different emotional content. In other words, the "content" of the artwork changes based on the artist decision's use of form.

See also 
 Form follows function
 The medium is the message

References

Further reading 
 Against Interpretation, Susan Sontag.

Visual arts